This article includes the 2014 ITF Men's Circuit tournaments which occurred between July and September 2014.

Point distribution

Key

Month

July

August

September

References

External links
International Tennis Federation official website

 07-09